Istra is the name of two inhabited localities in Moscow Oblast, Russia.

Urban localities
Istra, Istrinsky District, Moscow Oblast, a town in Istrinsky District

Rural localities
Istra, Krasnogorsky District, Moscow Oblast, a settlement in Ilyinskoye Rural Settlement of Krasnogorsky District

References